Christian Mendes Cavalcanti (born 23 December 1972) is a Brazilian footballer who plays as a goalkeeper for Vorarlbergliga club FC Hörbranz. He has also worked as a player-coach. He holds Austrian citizenship.

Playing career
Mendes started his football career in his native Brazil, playing for Palestra and São Caetano. He then moved to Austria, where he played most of his career in the lower tiers of Austrian football, mainly in the province of Vorarlberg, beside stints in Switzerland and Germany. Most notably, he had two spells with Austria Lustenau and also worked for the club as a youth coach.

After Mendes was dismissed as player-coach at VfB Bezau, he began playing for FC St. Margrethen in the summer of 2021 at the age of 48. In October 2021, it was announced that Mendes would move to FC Hörbranz from January 2022.

Managerial career
In January 2015, Mendes was appointed head coach of SC Göfis in the Vorarlbergliga; his first managerial job. He was dismissed in May 2015.

In January 2016, he took over as head coach of FC Singen 04 in the German Verbandsliga Südbaden, functioning as a player-coach. The club finished bottom of the league table in the 2015–16 season.

Mendes became head coach of VfB Bezau on 3 May 2021. He only coached the team through five matches in the Vorarlbergliga before being dismissed in August 2021.

References

External links
 

1972 births
Living people
Footballers from Rio de Janeiro (city)
Brazilian footballers
Brazilian expatriate footballers
Association football goalkeepers
Associação Desportiva São Caetano players
SC Austria Lustenau players
FC Lustenau players
FC Kreuzlingen players
FC Chur 97 players
FC 08 Villingen players
Campeonato Brasileiro Série A players
Campeonato Brasileiro Série B players
Campeonato Brasileiro Série C players
Swiss 1. Liga (football) players
2. Liga Interregional players
2. Liga (Austria) players
Oberliga (football) players
Landesliga players
Expatriate footballers in Austria
Brazilian expatriate sportspeople in Austria
Expatriate footballers in Switzerland
Brazilian expatriate sportspeople in Switzerland
Expatriate footballers in Germany
Brazilian expatriate sportspeople in Germany
Brazilian football managers
Expatriate football managers in Austria
Expatriate football managers in Germany
Brazilian expatriate football managers